Miss Lithuania is a national Beauty pageant in Lithuania.

History

Miss Lithuania began in 1993 and debuted at the Miss World competition. The pageant traditionally broadcast live on "Lietuvos rytas TV". Since 2012, the Miss Lithuania Organization sends the second title to the Miss Universe pageant. The Miss Lithuania pageant organizes by Benas Gudelis in Vilnius, Lithuania. Due to a lack of sponsorship, the contest was cancelled in 2015 and not held since, nor any representatives sent to international pageants. 

Began in 2019 Edward Walson took over the franchise of Miss Universe in Lithuania by holding independently Miss Universe Lithuania competition. Walson was owning Miss Universe Italy and Miss Universo Portugal between 2016 and 2017.

Titleholders

Miss Lithuania 1988-2014
The following is a list of winners. From 1988 to present.

Miss Universe Lithuania 2019-present
The following is a list of winners. From 2019 to present.

Big Four pageants representatives

Miss Universe Lithuania

Miss Lietuva has started to send a Miss Lithuania to Miss Universe from 2012. In recent years a second title of Miss Lithuania Beauty Pageant crowned as "Miss Universe Lithuania". On occasion, when the winner does not qualify (due to age) for either contest, a runner-up is sent.

Miss World Lithuania

Miss Lietuva has started to send a Miss Lithuania to Miss World from 1993. In recent years the Miss Lithuania Beauty Pageant crowned a winner as "Miss World Lithuania". On occasion, when the winner does not qualify (due to age) for either contest, a runner-up is sent.

Miss International Lithuania

Miss International Lithuania has opened to call the official casting format to Lithuanian delegate to Miss International.

See also
Lithuania at major beauty pageants

References

External links 
Official website

 

Beauty pageants in Lithuania
Annual events in Lithuania
Lithuania
Lithuanian awards